Cuningham is a surname. Notable people with the surname include:

 David Cuningham (born 1997), Australian rules footballer
 Vera Cuningham (1897–1955), British artist 
 William Cuningham, 16th-century English physician, astrologer, and engraver

See also
 Cunningham
 Cuninghame